Nahr-e Ebn Arbeyd (also Romanized as Nahr-e Ebn ‘Arbeyd; also known as Nahr-e Ben ‘Arbeyd) is a village in Hoseyni Rural District, in the Central District of Shadegan County, Khuzestan Province, Iran. At the 2006 census, its population was 71, in 9 families.

References 

Populated places in Shadegan County